The Tangle-Coated Horse and Other Tales: Episodes from the Fionn Saga is a children's book by Ella Young, a collection of Irish legends from the Fenian Cycle. These are tales about the hero Fionn mac Cumhaill and his band of warriors, the Fianna. Illustrated by Vera Bock, the book was first published in 1929 and was a Newbery Honor recipient in 1930.

References

See also
The High Deeds of Finn MacCool, a 1967 children's novel retelling the stories of Fionn mac Cumhaill and the Fenian Cycle

1929 short story collections
1929 children's books
Children's short story collections
American children's books
Newbery Honor-winning works
Fenian Cycle